Supermercados Gigante was a large supermarket chain in Mexico. The chain expanded north of the border as well, as it also had locations in predominantly working-class Mexican-American communities of the United States.

The supermarket chain was owned by parent company Group Gigante, which also operates the restaurant chain Toks, and US retail chains such as RadioShack and Office Depot in Mexico.

Supermercados Gigante competed with several other chains, such as Soriana, Comercial Mexicana, Chedraui, Wal-Mart, H-E-B, Falabella, Cencosud and D&S. It was not uncommon to see Wal-Mart receipts around the store touting the fact that said items are cheaper at Supermercados Gigante.

Supermercados Gigante in pop culture
The chain appeared on the Ahí Viene Verónica film, and on miscellaneous TV Azteca shows.

Store closures
On February 28, 2006 Gigante closed some stores in Mexico (1 in Torreon, 7 in Monterrey, 1 in Matamoros, 2 in San Luis Potosí and 1 in Puebla).

Gigante store closures

Sale of Gigante
As of Dec. 6, 2007 Supermercados Gigante was acquired by Organizacion Soriana for US$1.35 billion. The supermarket and hypermarket retail formats of Supermercados Gigante, including its seven US stores, will disappear and the stores will adopt the Soriana formats. The US stores were acquired by Bodega Latina Corp., the US subsidiary of Grupo Comercial Chedraui, and these stores were converted to Bodega Latina's El Super store banner (Bodega Latina changed its name in 2022 to Chedraui USA). Grupo Gigante will remain in business as a company separate from Soriana, operating the Mexican Radio Shack and Office Depot locations, as well as the Toks restaurant chain.

External links
 Grupo Gigante website—
 Gigante USA—
 Grupo Comercial Chedraui website—
 Chedraui USA website—

Supermarkets of Mexico
Retail companies established in 1962
Retail companies disestablished in 2008
Mexican companies established in 1962 
2008 disestablishments in Mexico